Dąbie  (formerly German Gersdorf) is a village in Krosno Odrzańskie County, Lubusz Voivodeship, in western Poland. It is the seat of the gmina (administrative district) called Gmina Dąbie.

The village has a population of 417.

References

Villages in Krosno Odrzańskie County